HMS BYMS-2282 was a  of the Royal Navy during the Second World War. She was built as YMS-282 for the United States Navy but was transferred under Lend-Lease to the United Kingdom upon completion and never commissioned into the United States Navy. BYMS-2282 was transferred to the Polish Navy after conclusion of the war and served as ORP Mors.

Career 
She was laid down on 15 August 1942 as YMS-282 by the San Diego Marine Construction Co., San Diego, California and launched on 30 November 1942. Upon completion on 26 August 1943, she was transferred to the Royal Navy under Lend-Lease as HMS BYMS-2282.

She was transferred to the Polish Navy on 18 April 1948 as ORP Mors and struck on 8 January 1957. Her ultimate fate is unknown.

References

External links 
 
 Photograph of BYMS-2282 in 1947 

YMS-1-class minesweepers of the United States Navy
Ships built in San Diego
1942 ships
World War II minesweepers of the United States
Ships transferred from the United States Navy to the Royal Navy
BYMS-class minesweepers
World War II minesweepers of the United Kingdom
YMS-1-class minesweepers of the Polish Navy
Cold War minesweepers of Poland